Minuscule 912 (in the Gregory-Aland numbering), α 366 (von Soden), is a 13th-century Greek minuscule manuscript of the New Testament on parchment.

Description 
The codex contains the text of the Book of Acts, Pauline epistles, and Catholic epistles, on 206 parchment leaves (size ).

The text is written in two columns per page, and 31 lines per page.

The text is divided according to chapters, whose numbers are given at the margin, and their titles at the top of the pages.

Text 
Kurt Aland the Greek text of the codex placed in Category V.
It means it is a representative of the Byzantine text-type.

History 
According to Scrivener and C. R. Gregory the manuscript was written in the 13th century. Currently the manuscript is dated by the INTF to the 13th century.

Formerly it was held in the Simonopetra monastery at Athos peninsula. It was brought by Robert Curzon to London in 1837. C. R. Gregory saw it in 1883.

The manuscript was added to the list of New Testament manuscripts by Scrivener (218a, 236p) and Gregory (228a, 283p). In 1908 Gregory gave the number 912 to it.

It is currently housed in the British Library (Add MS 39600) in London.

See also 

 List of New Testament minuscules
 Minuscule 911
 Biblical manuscript
 Textual criticism

References

Further reading

External links 
 

Greek New Testament minuscules
13th-century biblical manuscripts
British Library additional manuscripts